Perrin Kent Spencer (July 14, 1848 – October 21, 1910) was an American politician in the state of Washington. He served in the Washington House of Representatives from 1895 to 1897 and in 1889.

References

Members of the Washington House of Representatives
1848 births
1910 deaths
Washington (state) Populists
19th-century American politicians
People from Williamsport, Indiana